Fab is an ice cream brand made by Nestlé. Both the ice lolly on a stick brands 'Zoom' and 'FAB', were introduced in United Kingdom by J. Lyons & Co. Ltd., and were brought out in order to take advantage of the popularity of Gerry Anderson's television series Fireball XL5 and Thunderbirds.

The brand Zoom was launched first, in April/May 1963, to capitalise on Fireball XL5, with Fab appearing in May 1967. Initially the Zoom's commercial target was for boys only, being rocket shaped, which left a vast market niche that was filled by the development of the "Fab"; a more feminine looking lolly designed in mind for girls. The lolly was originally pitched at the female market with the association to purchase being the attraction of Lady Penelope. Regularly used in the show was the phrase "F-A-B" as an equivalent to "Roger" (communications jargon indicating that a message has been received).  The original lolly packaging had a prominent image of Lady Penelope and her butler/driver Parker on the wrapper.

The lolly consists of strawberry fruit ice and cream with the top portion dipped in chocolate and coated with sugar confectionery (Sugar strands). In the modern era, their popularity has reduced having been replaced by lollies such as the Twister and various ice snacks based on cartoon characters, however Nestlé still continue production of the iced snack into the 21st century, both as a single item and as part of a multipack.

The description on the packaging reads "Real Strawberry and vanilla flavour ice lolly with chocolate flavour coating (5%) and sugar strands (5%)".

The fab lolly, Fruit And Berries, has changed from a jelly type centre many years ago, to strawberry ice used now. An orange variety has also been manufactured as has a limited edition lemon flavour,  a limited edition apple and blackcurrant flavour (in 2000), and a limited edition tropical flavour in 2003. A new limited edition lolly was created in 2018, to celebrate fifty years of Fab lollies. The "Birthday Cake" lolly has raspberry water and sponge cake flavour ice with a vanilla flavour coating and sugar strands.

In 2019 Nestlé introduced a Raspberry Doughnut flavour of the brand with a Raspberry doughnut flavour water ice lolly with a raspberry sauce centre, with the usual chocolate flavour coating and sugar strands.

The brand's connection to the Thunderbirds television series has not been maintained, and was quietly dropped in the early-1970s.

See also
 List of frozen dessert brands

References

External links
Froneri UK

Products introduced in 1967
Brand name frozen desserts
British brands